Martin Doležal (born 3 May 1990) is a Czech professional footballer who plays as a forward for the Ekstraklasa club Zagłębie Lubin and the Czech Republic national team as a striker.

International
He made his debut for Czech Republic national football team on 15 November 2018 in a friendly against Poland.

Honours 
SK Sigma Olomouc
 Czech Supercup: 2012

References

External links
 
 
 

1990 births
People from Valašské Meziříčí
Living people
Czech footballers
Czech Republic international footballers
Association football forwards
Czech First League players
Ekstraklasa players
SK Sigma Olomouc players
FK Fotbal Třinec players
FC Zbrojovka Brno players
FK Jablonec players
Zagłębie Lubin players
Czech expatriate footballers
Czech expatriate sportspeople in Poland
Expatriate footballers in Poland
Sportspeople from the Zlín Region